Presidential elections were held in Liberia in 1863. The result was a victory for Daniel Bashiel Warner of the Republican Party. Warner took office on 4 January 1864.

References

Liberia
1863 in Liberia
Elections in Liberia
Election and referendum articles with incomplete results